Nour El Din Hassanein (born 10 August 1988) is an Egyptian rower. He competed in the men's single sculls event at the 2012 Summer Olympics.

References

1988 births
Living people
Egyptian male rowers
Olympic rowers of Egypt
Rowers at the 2012 Summer Olympics
21st-century Egyptian people